= Ekwerazu Ogwa =

Village in Owerri, Imo State, Nigeria

Ekwerazu Ogwa is a village in southeastern Nigeria. Also, it is located near the city of Owerri.
